Tegulifera is a genus of snout moths described by Max Saalmüller in 1880. Some authorities list it as a synonym of Zitha.

Type species
 Tegulifera rubicundalis Saalmüller, 1880

Species
Some species of this genus are:
 Tegulifera albostrigalis Saalmüller, 1880
 Tegulifera anneliese Viette, 1981
 Tegulifera audeoudi de Joannis, 1927
 Tegulifera bostralis Hampson, 1917
 Tegulifera capuronalis Viette, 1960
 Tegulifera catalalis Marion & Viette, 1956
 Tegulifera chromalis Hampson, 1917
 Tegulifera conisalis Hampson, 1917
 Tegulifera contestalis (Caradja, 1925)
 Tegulifera cyanealis (Mabille, 1879)
 Tegulifera elaeomesa Hampson, 1918
 Tegulifera flaveola Hampson, 1917
 Tegulifera flavirubralis (Hampson, 1906)
 Tegulifera gallienalis Viette, 1960
 Tegulifera herbulotalis Marion, 1954
 Tegulifera holothermalis Hampson, 1906
 Tegulifera humberti Viette, 1973
 Tegulifera irroralis Hampson, 1917
 Tegulifera kwangtungialis Caradja, 1925
 Tegulifera lanitralis Viette, 1978
 Tegulifera lignosalis Viette, 1960
 Tegulifera marionalis Viette, 1960
 Tegulifera metasarcistis Hampson, 1917
 Tegulifera millotalis Viette, 1960
 Tegulifera nosivolalis Viette, 1960
 Tegulifera oblunata (Warren, 1897)
 Tegulifera obovalis Hampson, 1917
 Tegulifera ochrealis Hampson, 1917
 Tegulifera ochrimesalis Hampson, 1917
 Tegulifera pallidalis Hampson, 1917
 Tegulifera pernalis Viette, 1960
 Tegulifera purpurascens Hampson, 1917
 Tegulifera radamalis Viette, 196
 Tegulifera rosalinde Viette, 1981
 Tegulifera rubicundalis Saalmüller, 1880
 Tegulifera sanguinalis Marion, 1954
 Tegulifera sanguinea Warren, 1891
 Tegulifera semicircularis Hampson, 1917
 Tegulifera tristiculalis Saalmüller, 1880
 Tegulifera zombitsalis Viette, 1960
 Tegulifera zonalis (Warren, 1897)

References

Pyralinae
Pyralidae genera